Az Zibar is a small town on the Great Zab in the mountains of the Erbil Governorate, Kurdistan Region in Iraq.

References

Populated places in Erbil Governorate